Erie County Medical Center (ECMC) is a hospital with 550 beds located in the East Side of Buffalo, New York and a member of the Great Lakes Health System. It is the primary teaching hospital for the University at Buffalo. It is also a New York State public-benefit corporation.

Organization

The Erie County Medical Center Corporation, as it is known when filing financial reports to the New York State Comptroller and the New York State Authorities Budget Office, is guided by a 19-member board of directors, 4 of whom are non-voting. There are eight voting members who are appointed by the New York State Governor and there are seven voting members who are appointed by the Erie County Executive. The management team is headed by CEO Thomas J. Quatroche, Jr. In 2017, it had operating expenses of $636.03 million, an outstanding debt of $272.51 million, and a staffing level of 4,023 people.

History

Erie County Medical Center (then known as Buffalo City Hospital) was formed in 1912 when the nearby Municipal Hospital on East Ferry Street had become overcrowded due to outbreaks in scarlet fever and tuberculosis and opened in 1918. Three years later, ECMC opened its first medical library, and later a social services department. The hospital would be named for Dr. Edward J. Meyer, its first chairman, in 1939. The current hospital facility would be opened in 1978 and was renamed Erie County Medical Center. In 1989, it would open its burn treatment center.

Care and services
ECMC is designated as Western New York's designated trauma and HIV/AIDS treatment center. It also features the Roger W. Seibel Burn Treatment Center, which is the regional burn center for Western New York.  Buffalo Public Schools' P.S. 84 (Health Care Center for Children @ ECMC), the designated school in the district for students with severe disabilities/illnesses, is housed at ECMC.

Cafeteria and patient menu controversies
On January 19, 2015, the Buffalo Evening News indicated that a report by the Physicians Committee for Responsible Medicine criticized ECMC for "serving some of the least-healthy food options of any public hospital in the country. The hospital received the fourth-lowest score, out of 200 hospitals reviewed, because it is home to three fast-food restaurants and because its cardiac patient menu has some items that aren’t heart-friendly." In 2019, ECMC replaced the previous food provider, Morrison Healthcare, with Metz Culinary Management.  In 2021, ECMC pursued legal action in an attempt to terminate a lease with Benderson Development, and remove the fast-food restaurants from their lobby, in order to replace them with healthier options.

See also
 Nassau University Medical Center
 Roswell Park Comprehensive Cancer Center
 Westchester Medical Center University Hospital

References

External links

U.S. News & World Report ranking of Erie County Medical Center for various categories
Erie County Medical Center Corporation website, a New York state public-benefit corporation

Hospital buildings completed in 1918
Buildings and structures in Buffalo, New York
Healthcare in Buffalo, New York
Hospitals established in 1912
Hospitals in New York (state)
Non-profit organizations based in New York (state)
1912 establishments in New York (state)
Trauma centers